Club Deportivo Anguiano is a Spanish football team based in Anguiano in the autonomous community of La Rioja. Founded in 1999, it plays in 3ª - Group 16. Its stadium is Estadio Isla with a capacity of 1,000 seats.

History 
In the 2015-16 season the club finished 6th in the Tercera División, Group 16. The next season in Tercera the club finished also on the 6th place.

Season to season

16 seasons in Tercera División

Ground

References

External links
Futbolme team profile 

Football clubs in La Rioja (Spain)
Association football clubs established in 1999
1999 establishments in Spain